The Crown Jewels is a 2011 Swedish drama film directed by Ella Lemhagen based upon a story by Carina Dahl. It stars Alicia Vikander and Bill Skarsgård.

Plot
Fragancia is arrested for the attempted murder of Richard Persson, the son of a powerful factory owner. The story goes through a lot of twists and turns.

Cast
Alicia Vikander as Fragancia Fernandez
Bill Skarsgård as Richard Persson
Loa Falkman as Factory Owner Persson
Michalis Koutsogiannakis as Fernandez Fernandez
Jesper Lindberger as Jesus Fernandez
Alexandra Rapaport as Marianne Fernandez
Natalie Minnevik as Belinda
Björn Gustafsson as Pettersson-Jonsson
Amanda Junegren as Young Fragancia Fernandez
Jonatan Bökman as Young Richard Persson
Noah Byström as Young Pettersson-Jonsson
Michael Segerström as Father Hjalmar
Timbuktu as Remmy
Kjell Wilhelmsen as Butcher Jonsson
Tomas von Brömssen as Commissioner Samnerud
David Lenneman as Goldie
Martin Eliasson as Karsten
Nour El-Refai as Midwife

References

External links

Swedish drama films
2011 films
2010s Swedish-language films
Films directed by Ella Lemhagen
Patricide in fiction
Films about child abuse
2011 drama films
2010s Swedish films